Port Miami, PortMiami, Port of Miami, or variation, may refer to:

 PortMiami (Dante B. Fascell Port of Miami), Florida, USA; the seaport of the city of Miami; at the mouth of the Miami River on Biscayne Bay
 Port Miami Tunnel (S.R. 887), Miami, Florida, USA; a tunnel under Biscayne Bay
 Miami River Port, Miami River (Florida), Miami, Florida, USA; a riverine port with seaborne commercial service
 Port of Miami (album), 2006 album by Rick Ross
 Port of Miami 2, 2019 album by Rick Ross

See also

 Miami airport (disambiguation)
 Fort Miami (disambiguation)
 Miami (disambiguation)
 Port (disambiguation)